John Herbert Sebastian Skinner (1861 – 2 June 1934) was a British trade unionist.

Skinner was born in Tiverton in Devon. He was living with a 27-year-old aunt prior to his 10th birthday. He worked as a compositor and moved to Kingston-upon-Hull to work at a newspaper there.  He became involved with the Typographical Association, and in 1894 became its full-time National Organiser.  From this post, he was promoted to Assistant General Secretary, then in 1900 was elected as its General Secretary.

During his time as General Secretary, Skinner devoted much effort to building links with other unions.  He represented the Typographical Association to the Trades Union Congress (TUC), serving for a time on the General Council of the TUC, and in 1908 being chosen as its delegate to the American Federation of Labour.  He also served on the Joint Industrial Council and Printing and Kindred Trades Federation.

Skinner resigned from his trade union posts around the start of 1933, due to poor health, and died 18 months later in Manchester.

References

1861 births
1934 deaths
British trade union leaders
Members of the General Council of the Trades Union Congress
Members of the Parliamentary Committee of the Trades Union Congress
People from Tiverton, Devon
Date of birth missing
Trade unionists from Devon